Fusha Sportive Reshit Rusi is a multi-use stadium in Shkodër, Albania.

References

Football venues in Albania
Buildings and structures in Shkodër